Selirong Island, also known as Mosquito Island, is an island located within the Brunei Bay and Mukim Labu, Temburong District, Brunei. The island also sits at the river delta of the Temburong River.

History 
In 1948, the  Labu–Selirong Wildlife Sanctuary was established. Initially in 1950, plans for both the Andulau and Selirong Forest Reserve were set to begin within that year but later fell through.

Tourism 
It is home to the Selirong Island Mangrove Park and Selirong Forest Reserve. Selirong is one of the ten islands used for ecotourism, research and educational purposes. In order to monitor and investigate the wildlife on the island, notably a  walkway and an observation tower were built.

Flora 
Animals such as the proboscis monkeys, macaques, kingfishers and eagles made up the fauna.

Fauna 
Plants such as the nipah palms, stilt roots, bakau trees can be found in the Pulau Selirong Forest Recreation Park.

Transportation 
The island can only be accessed by speedboats from Bandar Seri Begawan. The estimated time to reach the island from Muara is 45 minutes as it is required to pass through the Brunei River and across the Brunei Bay.

See also 

 Protected areas of Brunei

References 

Islands of Brunei
Protected areas of Brunei